Clavier or klavier may refer to:

 keyboard instrument
 harpsichord
 clavichord
 fortepiano
 Clavia DMI, a Swedish manufacturer of electronic musical instruments
 Klavier (ballet)
 Christian Clavier (born 1952), French actor
 Klavier Gavin, a character from the Apollo Justice: Ace Attorney games
 "Klavier", a song by German industrial metal band Rammstein from Sehnsucht
 Clavier, Liège, a municipality in Wallonia, Belgium
 Claviers, Var, France

See also
 The Well-Tempered Clavier
 The Short-Tempered Clavier